The Adi Shankara Institute of Engineering and Technology (ASIET), is a self-financing college, situated in Kalady, in Ernakulam district of Kerala. The college started on 31 August 2001.  ASIET is affiliated to APJ Abdul Kalam Technological University. This institution received ISO 9001-2000 certification for the quality systems from KPMG quality registrar in the year 2002 and upgraded to ISO 9001-2008 in the year 2012.
NBA accredited in 2018.

When Mahatma Gandhi University published the results of the B.Tech. examinations held in April 2010, several ASIET students were among the rank holders.]

The annual cultural and technical festival of this institution is called "Brahma".

Departments
 Civil Engineering
 Computer Science & Engineering
 Computer Science and Engineering (Artificial Intelligence)
 Electronics and Biomedical Engineering
 Electronics & Communication Engineering
 Electrical & Electronics Engineering
 Mechanical Engineering
 Robotics and Automation
 Business School (MBA)

Notable alumni
 Sshivada, Indian film actress

References

External links

Private engineering colleges in Kerala
Colleges affiliated to Mahatma Gandhi University, Kerala
Engineering colleges in Ernakulam district
Educational institutions established in 2001
2001 establishments in Kerala